Good Hope is a village in McDonough County, Illinois,  United States. Its population was 363 at the 2020 census.

History
Early in its history the town was also at times spelled "Goodhope".  It was settled by 1840.

Geography
U.S. Route 67 passes through the village as Monmouth Street, leading south  to Macomb, the county seat, and north  to Roseville.

The village is drained to the south by tributaries of Town Fork, an east-flowing tributary of Farm Fork, the La Moine River, and eventually the Illinois River.

Demographics

As of the census of 2000, there were 415 people, 175 households, and 120 families residing in the village. The racial makeup of the village was 99.28% White, 0.24% Native American, 0.24% from other races, and 0.24% from two or more races. Hispanic or Latino of any race were 0.48% of the population.

There were 175 households, out of which 27.4% had children under the age of 18 living with them, 61.7% were married couples living together, 5.1% had a female householder with no husband present, and 30.9% were non-families. 28.0% of all households were made up of individuals, and 10.3% had someone living alone who was 65 years of age or older. The average household size was 2.37 and the average family size was 2.93.

In the village, the population was spread out, with 26.0% under the age of 18, 5.3% from 18 to 24, 28.7% from 25 to 44, 23.4% from 45 to 64, and 16.6% who were 65 years of age or older. The median age was 39 years. For every 100 females, there were 101.5 males. For every 100 females age 18 and over, there were 99.4 males.

The median income for a household in the village was $37,386, and the median income for a family was $41,964. Males had a median income of $31,250 versus $21,000 for females. The per capita income for the village was $14,555. About 7.2% of families and 9.8% of the population were below the poverty line, including 10.2% of those under age 18 and 7.7% of those age 65 or over.

References

Villages in McDonough County, Illinois
Villages in Illinois